, 45 places are heritage-listed in the Shire of Boyup Brook, of which one is on the State Register of Heritage Places. The State Register of Heritage Places is maintained by the Heritage Council of Western Australia.

List

State Register of Heritage Places
The Western Australian State Register of Heritage Places, lists the following state registered place within the Shire of Boyup Brook:

Shire of Boyup Brook heritage-listed places
The following places are heritage listed in the Shire of Boyup Brook but are not State registered:

References

Boyup Brook
South West (Western Australia)